Alau Ali is a Maldivian Business man, and the current Chairman of the Maldives Stock Exchange and Vice President and one of the founding members of Maldives Association of Construction Industries (MACI).

Mr. Alau Ali is the Managing Director of Alia Investments, and is credited for his scope on enhancing and sustaining one of the most respected brands in Maldives, "Alia" and for his philanthropy.

References

Living people
Year of birth missing (living people)
People from Malé